Kansas History: A Journal of the Central Plains is a quarterly peer-reviewed academic journal that is published by the Department of History at Kansas State University with financial support from the Kansas Historical Foundation. It is included with membership to the Kansas Historical Foundation.

The journal covers research on Kansas and western history. The editor-in-chief is Kristen Epps; former editors are James E. Sherow and Virgil W. Dean. The journal moved its offices to Kansas State University in 2013; prior to this date the editing and production process was headquartered at the Kansas Historical Society in Topeka.

In recent years, the journal has won academic awards. In 2019, an article by Jay Price titled "Assembling a Buckle of The Bible Belt: From Enclave to Powerhouse" won the Arrington-Prucha Prize from the Western History Association for the best article on religion in the American West. In 2021, David Beyreis's article "'Meat as a Matter of Form': Food, Exchange, and Power on the Santa Fe Trail" won the "Coke" Wood Award for best historical monograph or article, given by Westerners International.

Since its founding in 1875 the Kansas Historical Society has issued three major history journals: Kansas Historical Collections (1875–1928), The Kansas Historical Quarterly (1931–1977), and Kansas History: A Journal of the Central Plains (established in 1978). 
 
This journal continues the academic journal entitled Kansas Historical Quarterly. It was established in 1931 and continued publication until 1977. The Kansas Historical Quarterly in turn continued Collections of the Kansas State Historical Society, and the society's other transactions, published by the Kansas State Historical Society from 1875 to 1928.

References

External links

History of the United States journals
History of Kansas
History of the American West
Publications established in 1978
Quarterly journals
English-language journals
Kansas State University